Cosmoscarta is a genus of froghoppers found in the Indo-Malayan region. Many of the species are boldly marked in black and red or yellow. A few species are of economic importance as they can cause injury to plants under cultivation.

The genus was erected by Stål on the basis of a large frons extending almost to the eyes and lacking any longitudinal furrows or keels. The hind tibia has a strong spine at the mid position and sometimes a smaller spine near the base. The related genus Phymatostetha has a narrower pronotum with the  posterior margin straighter or with a sinuate margin before the scutellum.

Cosmoscarta dorsimacula is sometimes considered a pest on glutinous rice yam (Dioscorea alata). Cosmoscarta relata has been recorded in large numbers on jackfruit (Artocarpus heterophyllus).

Species in the genus include:

 Cosmoscarta abdominalis 
 Cosmoscarta aerata 
 Cosmoscarta affinis 
 Cosmoscarta amabilis 
 Cosmoscarta amymone 
 Cosmoscarta andamana 
 Cosmoscarta angulifera 
 Cosmoscarta apiana 
 Cosmoscarta arethusa 
 Cosmoscarta assamensis 
 Cosmoscarta balteata 
 Cosmoscarta bicincta 
 Cosmoscarta bicolor 
 Cosmoscarta bimacula 
 Cosmoscarta bipunctata 
 Cosmoscarta bispecularis 
 Cosmoscarta boutharensis 
 Cosmoscarta brevis 
 Cosmoscarta brevistriga 
 Cosmoscarta bruneoscutellata 
 Cosmoscarta callirrhoe 
 Cosmoscarta callizona 
 Cosmoscarta carens 
 Cosmoscarta carpentieri 
 Cosmoscarta castanea 
 Cosmoscarta celebesensis 
 Cosmoscarta chrysomelaena 
 Cosmoscarta concisa 
 Cosmoscarta confinis 
 Cosmoscarta consociata 
 Cosmoscarta contigua 
 Cosmoscarta convexa 
 Cosmoscarta coronis 
 Cosmoscarta decisa 
 Cosmoscarta dimidiata 
 Cosmoscarta diminuta 
 Cosmoscarta dimota 
 Cosmoscarta discessa 
 Cosmoscarta discrepans 
 Cosmoscarta dorsalis 
 Cosmoscarta dorsimacula 
 Cosmoscarta dryope 
 Cosmoscarta ducens 
 Cosmoscarta egens 
 Cosmoscarta egentior 
 Cosmoscarta egeria 
 Cosmoscarta elegantula 
 Cosmoscarta exultans 
 Cosmoscarta fictilis 
 Cosmoscarta flora 
 Cosmoscarta florella 
 Cosmoscarta forcipata 
 Cosmoscarta fumosa 
 Cosmoscarta fuscoapicalis 
 Cosmoscarta gracilis 
 Cosmoscarta gravelyi 
 Cosmoscarta greeni 
 Cosmoscarta hainanensis 
 Cosmoscarta hecuba 
 Cosmoscarta heroina 
 Cosmoscarta herossa 
 Cosmoscarta himalayana 
 Cosmoscarta hyale 
 Cosmoscarta hyalinipennis 
 Cosmoscarta ignifera 
 Cosmoscarta imrayi 
 Cosmoscarta inconspicua 
 Cosmoscarta indecisa 
 Cosmoscarta innominata 
 Cosmoscarta innota 
 Cosmoscarta insularis 
 Cosmoscarta irresoluta 
 Cosmoscarta lacerata 
 Cosmoscarta lateralis 
 Cosmoscarta laticincta 
 Cosmoscarta lestachei 
 Cosmoscarta leucothoe 
 Cosmoscarta liriope 
 Cosmoscarta luangana 
 Cosmoscarta lunata 
 Cosmoscarta macgillivrayi 
 Cosmoscarta maculifascia 
 Cosmoscarta mandarina 
 Cosmoscarta mandaru 
 Cosmoscarta margheritae 
 Cosmoscarta maura 
 Cosmoscarta metallica 
 Cosmoscarta miniata 
 Cosmoscarta minor 
 Cosmoscarta mnemosyne 
 Cosmoscarta montana 
 Cosmoscarta nagasana 
 Cosmoscarta naiteara 
 Cosmoscarta nexa 
 Cosmoscarta nigriceps 
 Cosmoscarta nigriventris 
 Cosmoscarta nigroguttata 
 Cosmoscarta nitidula 
 Cosmoscarta nycteis 
 Cosmoscarta nympha 
 Cosmoscarta ochraceicollis 
 Cosmoscarta orchymonti 
 Cosmoscarta orithyia 
 Cosmoscarta pallida 
 Cosmoscarta palopona 
 Cosmoscarta peguensis 
 Cosmoscarta pellucida 
 Cosmoscarta perstrigata 
 Cosmoscarta pictilis 
 Cosmoscarta pirene 
 Cosmoscarta prompta 
 Cosmoscarta pronotalis 
 Cosmoscarta psecas 
 Cosmoscarta pulchella 
 Cosmoscarta putamara 
 Cosmoscarta raja 
 Cosmoscarta relata 
 Cosmoscarta rhanis 
 Cosmoscarta rubromaculata 
 Cosmoscarta rubroscutellata 
 Cosmoscarta samudra 
 Cosmoscarta sanguinolenta 
 Cosmoscarta semimaculata 
 Cosmoscarta septempunctata 
 Cosmoscarta sequens 
 Cosmoscarta sexmaculata 
 Cosmoscarta shillongana 
 Cosmoscarta silpha 
 Cosmoscarta siniphila 
 Cosmoscarta sulukensis 
 Cosmoscarta sumbawana 
 Cosmoscarta sundana 
 Cosmoscarta sylvestris 
 Cosmoscarta taprobanensis 
 Cosmoscarta thalia 
 Cosmoscarta thoracica 
 Cosmoscarta timorensis 
 Cosmoscarta tolina 
 Cosmoscarta trichodias 
 Cosmoscarta trifasciata 
 Cosmoscarta trigona 
 Cosmoscarta trimacula 
 Cosmoscarta turaja 
 Cosmoscarta vernalis 
 Cosmoscarta wallacei 
 Cosmoscarta whiteheadi 
 Cosmoscarta zonaria 
 Cosmoscarta zonata

References 

Cercopidae
Auchenorrhyncha genera
Hemiptera of Asia
Taxa named by Carl Stål